The Church of Saint Augustine, also known as the Archdiocesan Pontifical Shrine of Our Lady of Consolation and Cincture or the Immaculate Conception Parish, is a Roman Catholic church under the auspices of the Order of Saint Augustine located inside the historic walled city of Intramuros in Manila, Philippines. Completed in 1607, it is the oldest stone church in the country.

In 1993, San Agustin Church was one of four Philippine churches constructed during the Spanish colonial period to be designated as a World Heritage Site by UNESCO, under the collective title Baroque Churches of the Philippines. It was named a National Historical Landmark by the Philippine government in 1976.

Pope John Paul II granted a canonical coronation towards its enshrined Marian image of "Our Lady of Consolation" on September 4, 2000.

History

San Agustin Church is located in General Luna St, Manila, Metro Manila. The present structure is actually the third Augustinian church erected on the site. The first San Agustin Church was the first religious structure constructed by the Spaniards on the island of Luzon. Made of bamboo and nipa, it was completed in 1571, but destroyed by fire in December 1574 during the attempted invasion of Manila by the forces of Limahong. A second wooden structure built on the same site was destroyed in February 1583 by a fire that started when a candle ignited drapery on the funeral bier during services for Spanish Governor-General Gonzalo Ronquillo de Peñalosa.

The Augustinians decided to rebuild the church using stone, and to construct an adjacent monastery. Construction began in 1586, based on a design by Juan Macías. The structure was built using hewn adobe stones quarried from Meycauayan, Binangonan and San Mateo, Rizal. The work proceeded slowly due to the lack of funds and materials, as well as the relative scarcity of stone artisans. The monastery was operational by 1604, and the church was formally declared complete on January 19, 1607, and named Church of St. Paul of Manila. Macías, who had died before the completion of the church, was officially acknowledged by the Augustinians as the builder of the edifice.

San Agustin Church was sacked during the Battle of Manila, which occurred as part of the Seven Years' War. In 1854, the church was renovated under the supervision of Spanish architect Luciano Oliver. On June 3, 1863, the strongest earthquake at that time hit Manila leaving widespread destruction to the city, with San Agustin Church the only public building left undamaged. A series of strong earthquakes struck Manila again on July 18–20, 1880. This time, the tremors left a large crack in the east bell tower. The crack was eventually repaired, but the left tower was permanently removed with only the base remaining today. The church withstood the other major earthquakes that struck Manila before in 1645, 1699, 1754, 1796, 1825, 1852, 1863 and 1880 and served as a hospital for several of those injured during the earthquake in 1863.

On August 18, 1898, the church was the site where Spanish Governor-General Fermin Jaudenes prepared the terms for the surrender of Manila to the United States of America following the Spanish–American War.

On the night of August 13, 1932, a major fire inside Intramuros destroyed a portion of the adjacent San Agustin Monastery. The blaze also totally destroyed the Augustinian Provincial House across the road in Calle Real, as well as the ornate pedestrian bridge that once linked the Provincial House with the monastery.

During the Japanese occupation during the Second World War, San Agustin Church became a concentration camp. The Japanese troops removed the lower portion of the right front door of the church and placed sandbags on the resulting opening, turning the entrance into a makeshift machine gun post. In the final days of the Battle of Manila, hundreds of Intramuros residents and clergy were held hostage in the church by Japanese soldiers with many hostages killed during the three-week-long battle. It was the only one among seven churches of Intramuros to survive a leveling by combined American and Filipino ground forces in May 1945. While the church sustained damage to its roof, the adjacent monastery was completely destroyed.  In the 1970s the monastery was rebuilt as a museum under the design of architect Angel Nakpil. The church was renovated in 2013, with its colorful facade replaced by a sedate stone-colored one.

San Agustin Church and its adjacent convent, Convento de San Agustin, served as the provincial house and headquarters of the Augustinian Province of the Most Holy Name of Jesus of the Philippines of Spain ever since the province's founding in 1575 until 1901, when it transferred to Madrid. It once again became the headquarters of the Province in 1927, during the tenure of Fr. Gaudencio Castrillo, O.S.A. until just after the Second World War.

San Agustin Church is currently administered by the Augustinian friars of the Province of the Most Holy Name of Jesus of the Philippines.

Architecture 

The San Agustin Church is patterned after some of the magnificent temples built by the Augustinians in Mexico. The present edifice was built in 1587, and completed, together with the monastery, in 1604.  The atmosphere is medieval since "both church and monastery symbolize the majesty and equilibrium of a Spanish golden era."

The massive structure of the church is highlighted by the symmetry and splendor of the interiors (painted by two Italians who succeeded in producing trompe l'oeil) – the profile of the mouldings, rosettes and sunken panels which appear as three-dimensional carvings, a baroque pulpit with the native pineapple as a motif, the grand pipe organ, the antechoir with a 16th-century crucifix, the choir seats carved in molave with ivory inlays of the 17th century and the set of 16 huge and beautiful chandeliers from Paris.

A 2022 online study conducted by home services website Angi found out that the church is the "most beautiful building in the Philippines".

Famous burials
The church, as in its custom in its heyday, contained niches for burials of bones and remains. The following are notable burials within the premises of the church.
Miguel López de Legazpi 
Juan de Salcedo
Guido de Lavezaris
Juan Luna
Blessed Pedro Zuñiga
Francisco Alonso Liongson
Benito Natividad
Teodoro Agoncillo

Threats 
The Binondo-Intramuros bridge opened in 2022. Although the bridge is about 550 meters away from San Agustin Church, it is believed to have encroached on the buffer zone prescribed for church, which includes the walls of Intramuros and the immediate areas outside. However, the national government argues that the bridge will have no direct physical or visual impact to the San Agustin Church, owing to its remote distance and the number of taller structures between the bridge and the church.

So far, the World Heritage Convention (WHC) has identified several potential indirect and long-term impacts to the church. WHC noted that the church could be impacted by more ground vibration due to vehicular traffic, and air and noise pollution. Moreover, the bridge would have a direct visual impact on the overall setting and sense of place of the property, including Intramuros’ fortified wall, as well as the Maestranza strip and Plaza México, the visual corridor of the Pasig River, and the underlying remains of Baluarte de Santo Domingo. To mitigate the situation, it was recommended to the national government to reconsider the bridge's and location, convert the surrounding roads of the church into pedestrian areas, conduct structural assessment of the church, and adapt the design of the bridge to the character of Intramuros.

San Agustin Church was collectively declared as a UNESCO World Heritage Site in 1993, together with Paoay Church in Ilocos Norte, Santa Maria Church in Ilocos Sur, and Miag-ao Church in Iloilo. If it will be delisted, the three other churches would also be removed from UNESCO's heritage list.

See also

Architecture of the Philippines
Spanish Baroque architecture

References

Citations

Cited sources

External links

 World Heritage profile
 
 

Roman Catholic churches completed in 1607
Roman Catholic churches in Manila
Buildings and structures in Intramuros
Augustinian monasteries in the Philippines
World Heritage Sites in the Philippines
Baroque architecture in the Philippines
Cultural Properties of the Philippines in Metro Manila
National Historical Landmarks of the Philippines
National Cultural Treasures of the Philippines
Spanish Colonial architecture in the Philippines
17th-century Roman Catholic church buildings in the Philippines
Tourist attractions in Manila
Augustinian churches in the Philippines
1571 establishments in the Philippines
Churches in the Roman Catholic Archdiocese of Manila